Miffy's Adventures Big and Small is a CGI-animated television series based on the Miffy book series by Dutch artist Dick Bruna, and a continuation of Miffy and Friends (2003–07). The series aired on February 13, 2023 on NPO Zappelin in the Netherlands and on Tiny Pop in the UK. The series finale aired on June 15, 2019.

Episodes
The series had three seasons, each consisting of 13 seven-minute segments.

Production
Production began in September 2014. The series was publicly announced in October of the same year, at the MIPCOM trade show in Cannes, France. At the convention, the series' launch date was announced for fall 2015 to coincide with the sixtieth anniversary of the Miffy character. 52 segments were ordered in 2014, with an additional 26 segments later in 2016.

Broadcast
Miffy's Adventures Big and Small first aired on October 2, 2015. The series aired on Sony's Tiny Pop network in the UK, on ABC Kids in Australia, on e-Junior in the United Arab Emirates, on Akili Kids! in Kenya, on Nick Jr. Channel in the United States, on NET25 in the Philippines and on TVOKids in Canada. ABC released the series in Australia and PBS Distribution released the first two seasons in the US.

Notelist

References

External links
Miffy's Adventures Big and Small at NickJr.com

2010s British animated television series
2010s British children's television series
2010s preschool education television series
2015 British television series debuts
2015 Dutch television series debuts
2010s Dutch television series
2017 British television series endings
2017 Dutch television series endings
English-language television shows
British computer-animated television series
British television shows based on children's books
British preschool education television series
Animated preschool education television series
Animated television series about children
Animated television series about rabbits and hares
Television shows based on Dutch novels
Nickelodeon original programming
Nick Jr. original programming